The A4076 is a  long, primary trunk road in Pembrokeshire, Wales. The A4076 begins at the Salutation Square roundabout junction with the A40 by Pembrokeshire County Hall, then bypasses Haverfordwest to the southeast and continues south to the oil refineries, now converted into petroleum storage and distribution terminals, at Milford Haven.

Other main settlements from north to south are:
Merlin's Bridge (junction with A487)
Johnston (junction with A477)
Steynton (junction with A477 again)

References

External links
 

Roads in Wales
Transport in Pembrokeshire
Roads in Pembrokeshire